Kidzopolis is a themed kid's area with various rides at several Six Flags amusement parks. It opened in 2011 at Six Flags Great America, Six Flags New England, and Six Flags Fiesta Texas after being re-themed from Wiggles World. Six Flags Great Escape also had a version of the area, but it was transformed into an expansion of the Hurricane Harbor waterpark in 2019.

Shared attractions located within the themed area include Krazy Kups, a tea cup ride, and ZoomJets, a rotating plane ride.

History
On , Six Flags released their plan for 2007. It detailed new corporate alliances with Thomas the Tank Engine, The Wiggles, Tony Hawk, and several others. In 2007, Six Flags Great Adventure, Six Flags Great America, and Six Flags New England opened Wiggles World at their parks. In 2008, Six Flags Great Escape opened Wiggles World at their park. Six Flags Fiesta Texas opened a version Wiggles World in 2009.

In late 2010, Six Flags began the process of removing licensed theming from attractions. They terminated licenses with Thomas the Tank Engine, The Wiggles, Tony Hawk, Evel Knievel, and Terminator. This resulted in the removal of all Wiggles World theming and renaming attractions to suit the new Kidzopolis theme during the 2011 season. Six Flags Great Adventure is the only park that didn't transform its Wiggles World to Kidzopolis. Instead, their themed area was transformed to Safari Kids, and later renamed Jr. Thrillseekers in 2022.

For the 2015 season, Six Flags New England re-themed their Route 66 attraction to have a wild safari theme under the new name "Wild Wheelz." This allowed for the car ride to fit in with the area more as the old, antique Route 66 theme was out of place for the vibrant and colorful children's theme that the Kidzopolis area has.

After the 2018 season, Six Flags Great Escape removed its Krazy Kars, Krazy Kups, and Splish Splash Zone attraction to make way for an expansion to Hurricane Harbor, effectively closing the entire Kidzopolis area. The old theater is had been fenced off, leaving ZoomJets, now renamed to Island Air Adventures, as the only remaining attraction. Island Air Adventures operates as a water park attraction.

Attractions

Key
 Operating along with kids area
 No longer operating along with the kids area

See also
 Whistlestop Park
 2011 in amusement parks

References

External links
 The Great Escape Kids Rides
 Six Flags Fiesta Texas Kids Rides
 Six Flags Great America Kids Rides
 Six Flags New England Kids Rides

Themed areas in Six Flags amusement parks
Six Flags attractions
Six Flags Fiesta Texas
Six Flags Great America
Six Flags New England
The Great Escape and Hurricane Harbor
Amusement rides introduced in 2011